Phaedon Avouris (born 1945) is a Greek chemical physicist and materials scientist. He is an IBM Fellow and was formerly the group leader for Nanometer Scale Science and Technology at the Thomas J. Watson Research Center in Yorktown Heights, New York.

Education and professional positions
Avouris received his B.Sc. degree at the Aristotle University of Thessaloniki, Greece in 1968. After performing research on isotope effects in chemistry at the Research Center “Demokritos” in Greece, he received his Ph.D. degree in Physical Chemistry at Michigan State University in 1974. He did postdoctoral work on laser spectroscopy and molecular dynamics at UCLA, and was a Research Fellow at AT&T Bell Laboratories before joining the staff of IBM’s Research Division at the Thomas J. Watson Research Center in 1978. Over the years he led research groups at IBM in chemical physics, surface science and nanotechnology. In 2004, he was elected an IBM Fellow. While working at IBM, he was also adjunct research professor at Columbia University (Chemistry), the University of Illinois (Electrical and Computer Engineering), and at the University of Minnesota (Electrical Engineering).

Research work

Phaedon Avouris’ early work focused on the behavior of molecules adsorbed on surfaces. Avouris used scanning tunneling microscopy and spectroscopy (STM/S) to image on the atomic scale how chemical reactions take place at metal and semiconductor surfaces, and to study the factors that determine the reactivity of different surface sites. He also used STM to manipulate individual strongly-bonded atoms, clusters of atoms, molecules and nanostructures at surfaces.

Avouris is best known for his later pioneering contributions to nanoscience and nanotechnology. This work involves studies of the electrical and photonic properties of nanostructures, primarily carbon nanotubes and graphene, and their potential use in new electronic and photonics technologies. The research involves both basic science studies, as well as the fabrication and evaluation of novel, high performance nano-electronic and nano-photonic devices. Avouris and his research team produced the first carbon nanotube field effect transistors, logic gates and integrated electronic circuits. Analogous results were achieved using graphene, including the development of GHz high frequency transistors, integrated circuits, ultrafast infrared detectors, and plasmonic sensor devices.

Avouris published more than 500 scientific papers which have received over 100,000 citations (Google Scholar (2020); Microsoft Academic Search (2020). See also Thomson-Reuters: The World’s Most Influential Scientific Minds – Physics (2015). He has edited three books on 2D Materials (2017), Carbon Nanotubes (2001) and Atomic and Nanometer Scale Materials Manipulation (1992) and holds 23 patents.

Awards and honors
Phaedon Avouris was elected as member of the National Academy of Sciences in 2017, the American Academy of Arts and Sciences in 2003, the Academy of Athens, Greece (Corresponding member) in 2007,  and the IBM Academy of Technology in 2004.

He was also elected Fellow in the following scientific societies: American Physical Society (APS) in 1987; Institute of Physics (U.K.) in 2004; Institute of Electronic and Electrical Engineers (IEEE) in 2014); American Association for the Advancement of Science (AAAS) in 1996; Materials Research Society (MRS) in 2011; American Vacuum Society (AVS) in 1997; World Technology Network (1999). For his work Avouris has received many awards from diverse scientific institutions including:

 Irving Langmuir Prize for Chemical Physics, American Physical Society, 2003

 Medard W. Welch Award for Surface Science, American Vacuum Society, 1997
 IEEE Nanotechnology Section, Nanotechnology Pioneer Award, 2010
 Richard Feynman Prize for Nanotechnology, Foresight Institute, 1999
 Julius Springer Prize for Applied Physics (with T. Heinz), 2008
 MRS David Turnbull Lectureship, Materials Research Society, 2011
 Richard E. Smalley Prize of the Electrochemical Society, 2009
 H. Bloch Medal, Excellence of Research in Industry, Univ. of Chicago, 2015
 IBM Exceptional Achievement Corporate Award, 2011
 Outstanding Technical Achievement Awards, IBM Corporation, 1989, 1993, 2000, 2002, 2003, 2013, 2015
 Honorary Doctorate, International Hellenic University, 2013
 Distinguished Alumnus Award, Michigan State University, 2001

General References

 Phaedon Avouris, Manipulation of Matter at the Atomic and Molecular Levels, Accounts of Chemical Research (Special issue on the "Holy Grails" of Chemistry), 28, 95 (1995) Manipulation of Matter at the Atomic and Molecular Levels
 Philip G. Collins and Phaedon Avouris, Nanotubes and the Electronics of the Future, Scientific American 283, 38 (2000) Interconnect technologies using Carbon Nanotubes: Current status and future challenges
 Phaedon Avouris, Carbon Nanotube Electronics and Photonics, Physics Today 62,1, 34 (2009) doi: 10.1063/1.3074261
 ACS Nano, A Conversation with Dr. Phaedon Avouris: Nanoscience Leader, vol. 4, pp. 7041-7047 (2010) A Conversation with Dr. Phaedon Avouris: Nanoscience Leader
 IT History Society: Dr. Phaedon Avouris; Phaedon Avouris, Marcus Freitag and Vasili Perebeinos, Carbon Nanotube Optics and Optoelectronics, Nature Photonics 2, 341 (2008) Carbon-nanotube photonics and optoelectronics
 Ph. Avouris, C. Dimitrakopoulos, Graphene: Synthesis and Applications, Materials Today, 15, 86 (2012) Graphene: synthesis and applications
 Fengnian Xia, Phaedon Avouris, Interaction of Light with Graphene: Physics and Applications, IEEE Proceedings, 101, 1717 (2013) The Interaction of Light and Graphene: Basics, Devices, and Applications
 Tony Low and Phaedon Avouris, Graphene Plasmonics for Terahertz to Mid-Infrared Applications,  ACS Nano 8, 1086 (2014) Graphene Plasmonics for Terahertz to Mid-Infrared Applications

Representative Publications

LYO, I.-W.; AVOURIS, P. (1991-07-12). "Field-Induced Nanometer- to Atomic-Scale Manipulation of Silicon Surfaces with the STM". Science. 253 (5016): 173–176. doi:10.1126/science.253.5016.173. ISSN 0036-8075.

LYO, I.-W.; AVOURIS, P. (1991-07-12). "Field-Induced Nanometer- to Atomic-Scale Manipulation of Silicon Surfaces with the STM". Science. 253 (5016): 173–176. doi:10.1126/science.253.5016.173. ISSN 0036-8075. Field-Induced Nanometer- to Atomic-Scale Manipulation of Silicon Surfaces with the STM
I-W. Lyo and Ph. Avouris (1989). "Negative Differential Resistance on the Atomic Scale: Implications for Atomic Scale Devices". Science 245 (4924): 1369-1371. doi: 10.1126/science.245.4924.1369
Martel, R.; Schmidt, T.; Shea, H. R.; Hertel, T.; Avouris, Ph. (1998-10-21). "Single- and multi-wall carbon nanotube field-effect transistors". Applied Physics Letters. 73 (17): 2447–2449. doi:10.1063/1.122477. ISSN 0003-6951. Single- and multi-wall carbon nanotube field-effect transistors
Collins, P. G. (2001-04-27). "Engineering Carbon Nanotubes and Nanotube Circuits Using Electrical Breakdown". Science. 292 (5517): 706–709. doi:10.1126/science.1058782.
Martel, R.; Derycke, V.; Lavoie, C.; Appenzeller, J.; Chan, K. K.; Tersoff, J.; Avouris, Ph. (2001-12-03). "Ambipolar Electrical Transport in Semiconducting Single-Wall Carbon Nanotubes". Physical Review Letters. 87 (25): 256805. doi:10.1103/PhysRevLett.87.256805. ISSN 0031-9007
Wind, S. J.; Appenzeller, J.; Avouris, Ph. (2003-07-29). "Lateral Scaling in Carbon-Nanotube Field-Effect Transistors". Physical Review Letters. 91 (5): 058301.https://doi.org/10.1103%2FPhysRevLett.91.058301
Perebeinos, Vasili; Tersoff, J.; Avouris, Phaedon (2004-06-25). "Scaling of Excitons in Carbon Nanotubes". Physical Review Letters. 92 (25): 257402. Scaling of Excitons in Carbon Nanotubes
Chen, J., Perebeinos, V, Freitag, M., Tsang, J., Fu, Q., Liu, J., Avouris, P. (2005-11-18). "Bright Infrared Emission from Electrically Induced Excitons in Carbon Nanotubes". Science. 310 (5751): 1171–1174. ISSN 0036-8075. Bright Infrared Emission from Electrically Induced Excitons in Carbon Nanotubes
Chen, Z. (2006-03-24). "An Integrated Logic Circuit Assembled on a Single Carbon Nanotube". Science. 311 (5768): 1735–1735. ISSN 0036-8075. An Integrated Logic Circuit Assembled on a Single Carbon Nanotube
Chen, Zhihong; Lin, Yu-Ming; Rooks, Michael J.; Avouris, Phaedon (2007-12-01). "Graphene nano-ribbon electronics". Physica E: Low-dimensional Systems and Nanostructures. 40 (2): 228–232. ISSN 1386-9477. Graphene nano-ribbon electronics
Perebeinos, Vasili; Avouris, Phaedon (2008-07-30). "Phonon and Electronic Nonradiative Decay Mechanisms of Excitons in Carbon Nanotubes". Physical Review Letters. 101 (5): 057401. Phonon and Electronic Nonradiative Decay Mechanisms of Excitons in Carbon Nanotubes
Xia, Fengnian; Mueller, Thomas; Lin, Yu-ming; Valdes-Garcia, Alberto; Avouris, Phaedon (2009–12). "Ultrafast graphene photodetector". Nature Nanotechnology. 4 (12): 839–843. ISSN 1748-3395. Ultrafast graphene photodetector
Steiner, Mathias; Freitag, Marcus; Perebeinos, Vasili; Tsang, James C.; Small, Joshua P.; Kinoshita, Megumi; Yuan, Dongning; Liu, Jie; Avouris, Phaedon (2009-03-01). "Phonon populations and electrical power dissipation in carbon nanotube transistors". Nature Nanotechnology. 4 (5): 320–324. ISSN 1748-3387. Phonon populations and electrical power dissipation in carbon nanotube transistors
Mueller, Thomas; Xia, Fengnian; Avouris, Phaedon (2010-05). "Graphene photodetectors for high-speed optical communications". Nature Photonics. 4 (5): 297–301. ISSN 1749-4893. Graphene photodetectors for high-speed optical communications
Mueller, Thomas; Kinoshita, Megumi; Steiner, Mathias; Perebeinos, Vasili; Bol, Ageeth A.; Farmer, Damon B.; Avouris, Phaedon (2010-01). "Efficient narrow-band light emission from a single carbon nanotube p–n diode". Nature Nanotechnology. 5 (1): 27–31. ISSN 1748-3395. Efficient narrow-band light emission from a single carbon nanotube p–n diode
Xia, Fengnian; Farmer, Damon B.; Lin, Yu-ming; Avouris, Phaedon (2010-02-10). "Graphene Field-Effect Transistors with High On/Off Current Ratio and Large Transport Band Gap at Room Temperature". Nano Letters. 10 (2): 715–718. ISSN 1530-6984. Graphene Field-Effect Transistors with High On/Off Current Ratio and Large Transport Band Gap at Room Temperature
Lin, Y.-M.; Valdes-Garcia, A.; Han, S.-J.; Farmer, D. B.; Meric, I.; Sun, Y.; Wu, Y.; Dimitrakopoulos, C.; Grill, A.; Avouris, P.; Jenkins, K. A. (2011-06-10). "Wafer-Scale Graphene Integrated Circuit". Science. 332 (6035): 1294–1297. ISSN 0036-8075. Wafer-Scale Graphene Integrated Circuit
Wu, Yanqing; Lin, Yu-ming; Bol, Ageeth A.; Jenkins, Keith A.; Xia, Fengnian; Farmer, Damon B.; Zhu, Yu; Avouris, Phaedon (2011-04). "High-frequency, scaled graphene transistors on diamond-like carbon". Nature. 472 (7341): 74–78. ISSN 1476-4687. High-frequency, scaled graphene transistors on diamond-like carbon
Xia, Fengnian; Perebeinos, Vasili; Lin, Yu-ming; Wu, Yanqing; Avouris, Phaedon (2011-03). "The origins and limits of metal–graphene junction resistance". Nature Nanotechnology. 6 (3): 179–184. ISSN 1748-3395. The origins and limits of metal–graphene junction resistance
Engel, Michael; Steiner, Mathias; Lombardo, Antonio; Ferrari, Andrea C.; Löhneysen, Hilbert v; Avouris, Phaedon; Krupke, Ralph (2012-06-19). "Light–matter interaction in a microcavity-controlled graphene transistor". Nature Communications. 3 (1): 906. ISSN 2041-1723. PMC 3621428. PMID 22713748. Light–matter interaction in a microcavity-controlled graphene transistor
Yan, Hugen; Li, Xuesong; Chandra, Bhupesh; Tulevski, George; Wu, Yanqing; Freitag, Marcus; Zhu, Wenjuan; Avouris, Phaedon; Xia, Fengnian (2012-05). "Tunable infrared plasmonic devices using graphene/insulator stacks". Nature Nanotechnology. 7 (5): 330–334. ISSN 1748-3395. Tunable infrared plasmonic devices using graphene/insulator stacks
Freitag, Marcus; Low, Tony; Xia, Fengnian; Avouris, Phaedon (2012-12-16). "Photoconductivity of biased graphene". Nature Photonics. 7 (1): 53–59. ISSN 1749-4885. Photoconductivity of biased graphene
Yan, Hugen; Low, Tony; Zhu, Wenjuan; Wu, Yanqing; Freitag, Marcus; Li, Xuesong; Guinea, Francisco; Avouris, Phaedon; Xia, Fengnian (2013-05). "Damping pathways of mid-infrared plasmons in graphene nanostructures". Nature Photonics. 7 (5): 394–399. ISSN 1749-4893. Damping pathways of mid-infrared plasmons in graphene nanostructures
Low, T.; Perebeinos, V.; Tersoff, J.; Avouris, Ph. (2012-03-01). "Deformation and Scattering in Graphene over Substrate Steps". Physical Review Letters. 108 (9): 096601. Deformation and Scattering in Graphene over Substrate Steps
Freitag, Marcus; Low, Tony; Zhu, Wenjuan; Yan, Hugen; Xia, Fengnian; Avouris, Phaedon (2013-06-03). "Photocurrent in graphene harnessed by tunable intrinsic plasmons". Nature Communications. 4 (1): 1951. ISSN 2041-1723. Photocurrent in graphene harnessed by tunable intrinsic plasmons
Zhu, Wenjuan; Low, Tony; Lee, Yi-Hsien; Wang, Han; Farmer, Damon B.; Kong, Jing; Xia, Fengnian; Avouris, Phaedon (2014-01-17). "Electronic transport and device prospects of monolayer molybdenum disulphide grown by chemical vapour deposition". Nature Communications. 5 (1): 3087. doi:10.1038/ncomms4087. ISSN 2041-1723. Electronic transport and device prospects of monolayer molybdenum disulphide grown by chemical vapour deposition
Yan, Hugen; Low, Tony; Guinea, Francisco; Xia, Fengnian; Avouris, Phaedon (2014-08-13). "Tunable Phonon-Induced Transparency in Bilayer Graphene Nanoribbons". Nano Letters. 14 (8): 4581–4586. doi:10.1021/nl501628x. ISSN 1530-6984. Tunable Phonon-Induced Transparency in Bilayer Graphene Nanoribbons
Low, Tony; Guinea, Francisco; Yan, Hugen; Xia, Fengnian; Avouris, Phaedon (2014-03-18). "Novel Midinfrared Plasmonic Properties of Bilayer Graphene". Physical Review Letters. 112 (11): 116801. doi:10.1103/PhysRevLett.112.116801. Novel Midinfrared Plasmonic Properties of Bilayer Graphene
Koppens, F. H. L.; Mueller, T.; Avouris, Ph; Ferrari, A. C.; Vitiello, M. S.; Polini, M. (2014-10). "Photodetectors based on graphene, other two-dimensional materials and hybrid systems". Nature Nanotechnology. 9 (10): 780–793. doi:10.1038/nnano.2014.215. ISSN 1748-3395. Photodetectors based on graphene, other two-dimensional materials and hybrid systems
Farmer, Damon B.; Rodrigo, Daniel; Low, Tony; Avouris, Phaedon (2015-03-10). "Plasmon–Plasmon Hybridization and Bandwidth Enhancement in Nanostructured Graphene". Nano Letters. 15 (4): 2582–2587. doi:10.1021/acs.nanolett.5b00148. ISSN 1530-6984. Plasmon–Plasmon Hybridization and Bandwidth Enhancement in Nanostructured Graphene
Falk, Abram L.; Chiu, Kuan-Chang; Farmer, Damon B.; Cao, Qing; Tersoff, Jerry; Lee, Yi-Hsien; Avouris, Phaedon; Han, Shu-Jen (2017-06-22). "Coherent Plasmon and Phonon-Plasmon Resonances in Carbon Nanotubes". Physical Review Letters. 118 (25). doi:10.1103/physrevlett.118.257401. ISSN 0031-9007. Coherent Plasmon and Phonon-Plasmon Resonances in Carbon Nanotubes
Low, Tony; Chaves, Andrey; Caldwell, Joshua D.; Kumar, Anshuman; Fang, Nicholas X.; Avouris, Phaedon; Heinz, Tony F.; Guinea, Francisco; Martin-Moreno, Luis; Koppens, Frank (2017-02). "Polaritons in layered two-dimensional materials". Nature Materials. 16 (2): 182–194. doi:10.1038/nmat4792. ISSN 1476-4660. Polaritons in layered two-dimensional materials
Ho, Po-Hsun; Farmer, Damon B.; Tulevski, George S.; Han, Shu-Jen; Bishop, Douglas M.; Gignac, Lynne M.; Bucchignano, Jim; Avouris, Phaedon; Falk, Abram L. (2018-12-11). "Intrinsically ultrastrong plasmon–exciton interactions in crystallized films of carbon nanotubes". Proceedings of the National Academy of Sciences. 115 (50): 12662–12667. doi:10.1073/pnas.1816251115. ISSN 0027-8424. PMC 6294907. PMID 30459274.
Lee, In-Ho; Yoo, Daehan; Avouris, Phaedon; Low, Tony; Oh, Sang-Hyun (2019-02-11). "Graphene acoustic plasmon resonator for ultrasensitive infrared spectroscopy". Nature Nanotechnology. 14 (4): 313–319. doi:10.1038/s41565-019-0363-8. ISSN 1748-3387. Graphene acoustic plasmon resonator for ultrasensitive infrared spectroscopy
Lee, In-Ho; He, Mingze; Zhang, Xi; Luo, Yujie; Liu, Song; Edgar, James H.; Wang, Ke; Avouris, Phaedon; Low, Tony; Caldwell, Joshua D.; Oh, Sang-Hyun (2020-07-20). "Image polaritons in boron nitride for extreme polariton confinement with low losses". Nature Communications. 11 (1). doi:10.1038/s41467-020-17424-w. ISSN 2041-1723. Image polaritons in boron nitride for extreme polariton confinement with low losses
Avouris, Phaedon (1995-03-01). "Manipulation of Matter at the Atomic and Molecular Levels". Accounts of Chemical Research. 28 (3): 95–102. doi:10.1021/ar00051a002. ISSN 0001-4842. Manipulation of Matter at the Atomic and Molecular Levels

References

External links
 Nanometer Scale Science and Technology Group Homepage
 Irving Langmuir Prize
 Academy of Athens
 Feynman Prize Recipients, Foresight Nanotech Institute

1945 births
Living people
Fellows of the American Academy of Arts and Sciences
Greek academics
Greek nanotechnologists
IBM Fellows
Michigan State University alumni
Aristotle University of Thessaloniki alumni
Corresponding Members of the Academy of Athens (modern)